Steven Alzate (born 8 September 1998) is a professional footballer who plays as a midfielder for Belgian First Division A side Standard Liège on loan from Brighton & Hove Albion of the Premier League. He represents Colombia at international level and has made seven caps to date.

Club career

Leyton Orient
Alzate made his Football League debut as a second-half substitute for Sandro Semedo in Orient's 4–1 defeat at Stevenage on 28 February 2017. He scored his first senior goal in his next game, the 4–0 win at Newport County on 4 March 2017.

Brighton & Hove Albion
On 31 July 2017, Alzate signed for Brighton & Hove Albion for an undisclosed fee.

Loan Swindon Town

On 2 July 2018, Alzate joined League Two side Swindon Town on a season-long loan. His first goal for the club came on 22 September, against Yeovil Town, when he scored with a 20-yard strike. On 1 January 2019, Alzate was ruled out for at least three months after he was diagnosed with a stress fracture to his back. The loan deal expired on 9 January, and Alzate returned to Brighton.

Breakthrough at Brighton

Alzate made his debut for The Seagulls in the EFL Cup on 27 August 2019 where he played the full match in the 2–1 away win against Bristol Rovers setting up Glenn Murray's late winner. Alzate was named on the bench in a Premier League fixture for the first time in a 1–1 home draw against Burnley on 14 September. He remained an unused substitute. Alzate made his Premier League and league debut for Brighton on 21 September playing the full match in the 0–0 draw at Newcastle. He made his home debut on 5 October where he started the match against Tottenham Hotspur, which ended in a 3–0 victory.

Alzate scored his first Albion goal on 23 January 2021, deflecting a Alexis Mac Allister shot in the back of the net in a 2–1 home victory over Blackpool in the FA Cup fourth round, a match where he also recorded an assist for Yves Bissouma's 30 yard stunner. On 3 February 2021, Alzate scored his first Premier League goal to secure a 1–0 away win over Liverpool, sealing Brighton's first win at Anfield in Premier League history and their first league win at Liverpool since 1982. Alzate played in Brighton's 3–2 home victory over champions Manchester City on 18 May, with fans returning to football, in which The Seagulls went from 2–0 down to beat The Sky Blues for the first time since 1989.

Alzate made four appearances at the start of the  2021–22 season suffering an injury on his fourth appearance in the 1–1 away draw against bitter rivals Crystal Palace on 27 September, replacing the injured Dan Burn at half time before coming off injured himself 20 minutes later. He was later ruled out for three months with an ankle injury.
He made his return to action on Boxing Day, coming on as a substitute and helping Brighton maintain their lead in the 2–0 home victory over Brentford. Alzate made his first league start of the season where he played the whole match of the 1–1 home draw against European champions Chelsea on 18 January 2022.

Alzate scored a long distance effort in his first game of the 2022–23 season on 24 August 2022, scoring Brighton's second in the eventual 3–0 away win over League One side Forest Green Rovers in the second round of the EFL Cup .

Loan to Standard Liège

On 9 September 2022, Alzate signed for Standard Liège of the Belgium top flight on loan for the 2022–23 season.

International career
On 6 November 2019, Alzate received his first call-up to the Colombia national team for friendlies against Peru and Ecuador in November 2019. He made his debut on 16 November coming on as a substitute in a 1–0 home victory over Peru. Five days later he made his first start for Colombia in the 1–0 away win against Ecuador where he was highly praised by manager Carlos Queiroz. 

Alzate was recalled to the Colombia squad in January 2022 for 2022 FIFA World Cup qualifiers against Peru and Argentina, after not being included in selection since October 2020.

Personal life
Alzate was born in London, England, to Colombian parents.

Career statistics

Club

International

References

Living people
1998 births
English people of Colombian descent
Footballers from the London Borough of Camden
Colombian footballers
English footballers
Association football midfielders
English Football League players
Premier League players
Leyton Orient F.C. players
Brighton & Hove Albion F.C. players
Swindon Town F.C. players
Standard Liège players
Belgian Pro League players
Colombia international footballers
Colombian expatriate footballers
Expatriate footballers in Belgium
Colombian expatriate sportspeople in Belgium